Centrodera decolorata is a species of flower longhorn in the family Cerambycidae. It is found in North America.

References

Further reading

 
 
 
 
 
 

Lepturinae
Beetles described in 1841